Capella Tower (also 225 South Sixth) is an office skyscraper in Minneapolis, Minnesota, United States. The building opened in 1992 as First Bank Place, replacing One Financial Plaza as the headquarters for First Bank System. In 1997, First Bank System acquired US Bancorp and changed the name of the building to US Bancorp Place. The headquarters of US Bancorp moved into the US Bancorp Center in 2000, whereupon the tower changed to 225 South 6th Street.  In March 2009, the building took its present name.

The ranking of the building as the tallest in Minneapolis is in dispute.  The IDS Center is usually said to be taller by one foot, even by the owners of Capella Tower.  It was initially said to be built one foot shorter out of respect for the IDS Center; however, in 2005, it was revealed that contractors had surreptitiously added  of height to Capella, therefore making it taller than the main roof of IDS Center. In February 2005, the IDS counted a  window washing garage built on its roof in 1979 as part of its actual height, making it  taller than Capella Tower. This ambiguity between official measurements and public relations statements might be due in some part to the "halo" that extends out from the roof, which is apparently included in the building's official height (though this is unclear).

The IDS is taller on two measures. The IDS's communications spires add a significant amount of height making it , and it remains the tallest building in Minneapolis if measured by number of stories (57 vs. 56; actually tied for first with neighbor Wells Fargo Center).

Capella Tower is connected to the Minneapolis Skyway System and has . of office space.

Name origin 

In March 2008, Capella Education Co., longtime occupant of the building and owner of the for-profit online Capella University, signed a lease that changed the name of the tower to Capella Tower. The expanded facility houses all of the company's 1,150 downtown Minneapolis employees; as the online school does not have classrooms, the space houses administrative staff and faculty. The name change took place in March 2009.

Design
The office building, designed by Pei, Cobb, Freed & Partners, is laid out on an L-shaped site with the 58-story tower connected to the 20-story Star Tribune Building by an atrium.  The building combines six-story cubes and various round towers which echo the different styles of buildings in downtown Minneapolis.  The illuminated semicircle located atop the tower is not only decorative but also houses an antenna farm and communications network. This feature has given the building the nickname the "Halo Building".

Tenants
Baker Tilly
Houlihan Lokey
Morgan Stanley
Capella University
JP Morgan

See also
List of tallest buildings in Minnesota
List of tallest buildings in the United States

References

External links

Pei Cobb Freed & Partners

Office buildings completed in 1992
Skyscraper office buildings in Minneapolis
James Ingo Freed buildings